The 2010–11 Phoenix Suns season  was the 43rd season for the Phoenix Suns of the National Basketball Association (NBA). For the first time in eight seasons, the Suns were without the play of power forward Amar'e Stoudemire, a 5-time All-Star and former Rookie of the Year who joined the New York Knicks in the summer. The Suns traded Jason Richardson on December 18, 2010 as part of a trade that brought Vince Carter to the Suns. On February 24, 2011, the Suns traded Goran Dragić and the draft pick they got earlier from Orlando in exchange for Aaron Brooks. Alvin Gentry was head coach and the Suns played their home games at US Airways Center.

Key dates
June 24, 2010 – The 2010 NBA draft was held in New York City.
July 1, 2010 – The free agency period begun.
July 11, 2010 – The Suns traded with the Atlanta Hawks and the Toronto Raptors.
July 12, 2010 – The Suns announced Lon Babby as their newest vice president for basketball operations.
August 5, 2010 – The Suns announced Lance Blanks as their newest general manager, hiring him over Jeff Bower, Tommy Sheppard, Jeff Weltman, and Ronnie Lester.
December 18, 2010 – The Suns traded Jason Richardson, Hedo Türkoğlu, and Earl Clark to the Orlando Magic for Vince Carter, Mickaël Piétrus, Marcin Gortat, their 2011 first round draft pick and cash.
February 24, 2011 – The Suns traded Goran Dragić and a lottery protected 2011 draft pick to the Houston Rockets for Aaron Brooks.

Offseason

NBA Draft

Free agency

Amar'e Stoudemire opted out of his final year of his contract and became an unrestricted free agent. He was to be paid $17.7 million. He later joined the New York Knicks.

Channing Frye re-signed with Phoenix on a 5-year, $30 million contract on July 1. One day later, the Suns signed power forward Hakim Warrick to a 4-year, $16 million contract. At the same time, Phoenix ended up trading Leandro Barbosa and Dwayne Jones to the Toronto Raptors in exchange for Hedo Türkoğlu.

Roster

Regular season

Standings

Record vs. opponents

Game log

|- bgcolor="#ffcccc"
| 1
| October 5
| @ Sacramento
| 
| Jason Richardson (17)
| Robin Lopez (6)
| Chucky Atkins (4)
| ARCO Arena9,485
| 0–1
|- bgcolor="#ffcccc"
| 2
| October 8
| Toronto
| 
| Jared Dudley (10)
| Hedo Türkoğlu (8)
| Steve Nash (7)
| General Motors Place18,123
| 0–2
|- bgcolor="#ccffcc"
| 3
| October 9
| Dallas
| 
| Grant Hill (16)
| Robin Lopez (6)
| Steve Nash (10)
| Indian Wells Tennis Garden15,617
| 1–2
|- bgcolor="#ffcccc"
| 4
| October 12
| Utah
| 
| Goran Dragić (15)
| Josh Childress (8)
| Steve Nash (10)
| US Airways Center12,410
| 1–3
|- bgcolor="#ffcccc"
| 5
| October 14
| @ Utah
| 
| Hedo Türkoğlu (13)
| Jason Richardson,Garret Siler (7)
| Steve Nash (5)
| EnergySolutions Arena19,883
| 1–4
|- bgcolor="#ffcccc"
| 6
| October 17
| @ Toronto
| 
| Steve Nash (16)
| Steve Nash (7)
| Steve Nash (6)
| Air Canada Centre12,902
| 1–5
|- bgcolor="#ccffcc"
| 7
| October 19
| Golden State
| 
| Steve Nash (18)
| Robin Lopez (10)
| Steve Nash,Goran Dragić (4)
| US Airways Center14,635
| 2–5
|- bgcolor="#ffcccc"
| 8
| October 22
| Denver
| 
| Jared Dudley (17)
| Robin Lopez (7)
| Steve Nash (12)
| US Airways Center15,440
| 2–6
|-

|- bgcolor="#ffcccc"
| 1
| October 26
| @ Portland
| 
| Steve Nash (26)
| Channing Frye,Jason Richardson (6)
| Steve Nash (6)
| Rose Garden20,603
| 0–1
|- bgcolor="#ccffcc"
| 2
| October 28
| @ Utah
| 
| Hakim Warrick,Steve Nash (18)
| Grant Hill (12)
| Goran Dragić (6)
| EnergySolutions Arena19,911
| 1–1
|- bgcolor="#ffcccc"
| 3
| October 29
| L.A. Lakers
| 
| Grant Hill (21)
| Robin Lopez (14)
| Steve Nash (9)
| US Airways Center18,422
| 1–2

|- bgcolor="#ffcccc"
| 4
| November 3
| San Antonio
| 
| Jason Richardson (21)
| Grant Hill (8)
| Goran Dragić (8)
| US Airways Center17,060
| 1–3
|- bgcolor="#ccffcc"
| 5
| November 5
| Memphis
| 
| Jason Richardson (38)
| Channing Frye (11)
| Steve Nash (9)
| US Airways Center16,470
| 2–3
|- bgcolor="#ccffcc"
| 6
| November 7
| @ Atlanta
| 
| Jason Richardson (21)
| Jared Dudley,Grant Hill,Josh Childress (6)
| Steve Nash (15)
| Philips Arena13,395
| 3–3
|- bgcolor="#ffcccc"
| 7
| November 8
| @ Memphis
| 
| Grant Hill (19)
| Grant Hill (12)
| Steve Nash (11)
| FedExForum10,786
| 3–4
|- bgcolor="#ccffcc"
| 8
| November 12
| Sacramento
| 
| Steve Nash (28)
| Jason Richardson (8)
| Steve Nash (14)
| US Airways Center18,029
| 4–4
|- bgcolor="#ccffcc"
| 9
| November 14
| @ L.A. Lakers
| 
| Jason Richardson (35)
| Jason Richardson (8)
| Steve Nash (13)
| Staples Center18,997
| 5–4
|- bgcolor="#ccffcc"
| 10
| November 15
| Denver
| 
| Hakim Warrick (21)
| Josh Childress (8)
| Steve Nash (7)
| US Airways Center17,744
| 6–4
|- bgcolor="#ffcccc"
| 11
| November 17
| @ Miami
| 
| Steve Nash (17)
| Channing Frye,Hedo Türkoğlu (6)
| Hedo Türkoğlu (4)
| American Airlines Arena19,600
| 6–5
|- bgcolor="#ffcccc"
| 12
| November 18
| @ Orlando
| 
| Grant Hill (21)
| Channing Frye (6)
| Goran Dragić (4)
| Amway Center18,846
| 6–6
|- bgcolor="#ffcccc"
| 13
| November 20
| @ Charlotte
| 
| Grant Hill (23)
| Channing Frye (6)
| Goran Dragić (10)
| Time Warner Cable Arena16,428
| 6–7
|- bgcolor="#ccffcc"
| 14
| November 22
| @ Houston
| 
| Jason Richardson (26)
| Hedo Türkoğlu (9)
| Steve Nash (8)
| Toyota Center15,080
| 7–7
|- bgcolor="#ffcccc"
| 15
| November 24
| Chicago
| 
| Grant Hill (27)
| Hedo Türkoğlu (10)
| Steve Nash (16)
| US Airways Center18,422
| 7–8
|- bgcolor="#ccffcc"
| 16
| November 26
| L.A. Clippers
| 
| Jason Richardson (29)
| Jason Richardson,Hakim Warrick (6)
| Steve Nash (10)
| US Airways Center17,486
| 8–8
|- bgcolor="#ffcccc"
| 17
| November 28
| @ Denver
| 
| Jason Richardson (39)
| Jason Richardson (10)
| Steve Nash (11)
| Pepsi Center15,482
| 8–9

|- bgcolor="#ccffcc"
| 18
| December 2
| @ Golden State
| 
| Jason Richardson (25)
| Channing Frye (10)
| Steve Nash (16)
| Oracle Arena18,328
| 9–9
|- bgcolor="#ccffcc"
| 19
| December 3
| Indiana
| 
| Channing Frye (29)
| Goran Dragić (6)
| Steve Nash (11)
| US Airways Center18,422
| 10–9
|- bgcolor="#ccffcc"
| 20
| December 5
| Washington
| 
| Hakim Warrick (26)
| Earl Barron (8)
| Steve Nash (17)
| US Airways Center17,430
| 11–9
|- bgcolor="#ffcccc"
| 21
| December 7
| @ Portland
| 
| Steve Nash (24)
| Grant Hill (8)
| Steve Nash (14)
| Rose Garden20,151
| 11–10
|- bgcolor="#ffcccc"
| 22
| December 8
| Memphis
| 
| Goran Dragić (17)
| Josh Childress,Channing Frye,Hedo Türkoğlu (7)
| Steve Nash (7)
| US Airways Center16,288
| 11–11
|- bgcolor="#ffcccc"
| 23
| December 10
| Portland
| 
| Steve Nash (24)
| Channing Frye,Steve Nash (7)
| Steve Nash (5)
| US Airways Center17,284
| 11–12
|- bgcolor="#ccffcc"
| 24
| December 15
| Minnesota
| 
| Jason Richardson (29)
| Channing Frye (9)
| Steve Nash (19)
| US Airways Center16,997
| 12–12
|- bgcolor="#ffcccc"
| 25
| December 17
| @ Dallas
| 
| Hakim Warrick (15)
| Channing Frye,Hakim Warrick (14)
| Goran Dragić (10)
| American Airlines Center20,406
| 12–13
|- bgcolor="#ccffcc"
| 26
| December 19
| @ Oklahoma City
| 
| Grant Hill (30)
| Grant Hill (11)
| Steve Nash (10)
| Oklahoma City Arena18,203
| 13–13
|- bgcolor="#ffcccc"
| 27
| December 20
| @ San Antonio
| 
| Jared Dudley (27)
| Robin Lopez (7)
| Steve Nash (10)
| AT&T Center18,581
| 13–14
|- bgcolor="#ffcccc"
| 28
| December 23
| Miami
| 
| Jared Dudley (33)
| Jared Dudley (12)
| Steve Nash (18)
| US Airways Center18,422
| 13–15
|- bgcolor="#ffcccc"
| 29
| December 26
| @ L.A. Clippers
| 
| Mickaël Piétrus (25)
| Grant Hill (7)
| Steve Nash (15)
| Staples Center19,060
| 13–16
|- bgcolor="#ffcccc"
| 30
| December 29
| Philadelphia
| 
| Steve Nash (23)
| Marcin Gortat (6)
| Steve Nash (15)
| US Airways Center18,422
| 13–17
|- bgcolor="#ccffcc"
| 31
| December 31
| Detroit
| 
| Vince Carter,Jared Dudley (19)
| Vince Carter,Marcin Gortat (8)
| Marcin Gortat,Goran Dragić (5)
| US Airways Center17,637
| 14–17

|- bgcolor="#ffcccc"
| 32
| January 2
| @ Sacramento
| 
| Steve Nash (20)
| Marcin Gortat,Grant Hill (6)
| Steve Nash (12)
| ARCO Arena12,500
| 14–18
|- bgcolor="#ffcccc"
| 33
| January 5
| L.A. Lakers
| 
| Jared Dudley (21)
| Marcin Gortat (9)
| Steve Nash (10)
| US Airways Center18,105
| 14–19
|- bgcolor="#ffcccc"
| 34
| January 7
| New York
| 
| Vince Carter (19)
| Jared Dudley,Channing Frye (6)
| Steve Nash (9)
| US Airways Center17,621
| 14–20
|- bgcolor="#ccffcc"
| 35
| January 9
| Cleveland
| 
| Jared Dudley (21)
| Channing Frye (12)
| Steve Nash (17)
| US Airways Center17,031
| 15–20
|- bgcolor="#ffcccc"
| 36
| January 11
| @ Denver
| 
| Vince Carter,Steve Nash (15)
| Channing Frye (8)
| Steve Nash (7)
| Pepsi Center14,874
| 15–21
|- bgcolor="#ccffcc"
| 37
| January 12
| New Jersey
| 
| Vince Carter,Steve Nash (23)
| Channing Frye,Steve Nash (7)
| Steve Nash (16)
| US Airways Center16,334
| 16–21
|- bgcolor="#ccffcc"
| 38
| January 14
| Portland
| 
| Steve Nash (23)
| Channing Frye (8)
| Steve Nash (13)
| US Airways Center17,412
| 17–21
|- bgcolor="#ccffcc"
| 39
| January 17
| @ New York
| 
| Vince Carter (29)
| Vince Carter (12)
| Steve Nash (11)
| Madison Square Garden19,763
| 18–21
|- bgcolor="#ccffcc"
| 40
| January 19
| @ Cleveland
| 
| Grant Hill (27)
| Marcin Gortat,Grant Hill (12)
| Steve Nash (15)
| Quicken Loans Arena20,562
| 19–21
|- bgcolor="#ccffcc"
| 41
| January 21
| @ Washington
| 
| Channing Frye (25)
| Marcin Gortat (14)
| Steve Nash (14)
| Verizon Center15,716
| 20–21
|- bgcolor="#ffcccc"
| 42
| January 22
| @ Detroit
| 
| Steve Nash (14)
| Marcin Gortat (13)
| Steve Nash (8)
| The Palace of Auburn Hills21,326
| 20–22
|- bgcolor="#ffcccc"
| 43
| January 24
| @ Philadelphia
| 
| Jared Dudley (23)
| Jared Dudley (7)
| Steve Nash (9)
| Wells Fargo Center14,881
| 20–23
|- bgcolor="#ffcccc"
| 44
| January 26
| Charlotte
| 
| Steve Nash (27)
| Marcin Gortat (7)
| Steve Nash (15)
| US Airways Center16,986
| 20–24
|- bgcolor="#ccffcc"
| 45
| January 28
| Boston
| 
| Marcin Gortat (19)
| Marcin Gortat (17)
| Steve Nash (10)
| US Airways Center18,422
| 21–24
|- bgcolor="#ccffcc"
| 46
| January 30
| New Orleans
| 
| Marcin Gortat (25)
| Marcin Gortat (11)
| Steve Nash (15)
| US Airways Center17,921
| 22–24

|- bgcolor="#ccffcc"
| 47
| February 2
| Milwaukee
| 
| Marcin Gortat (19)
| Channing Frye (13)
| Steve Nash (13)
| US Airways Center16,422
| 23–24
|- bgcolor="#ffcccc"
| 48
| February 4
| Oklahoma City
| 
| Vince Carter (33)
| Channing Frye (9)
| Steve Nash (8)
| US Airways Center16,274
| 23–25
|- bgcolor="#ccffcc"
| 49
| February 7
| @ Golden State
| 
| Channing Frye (19)
| Channing Frye (11)
| Steve Nash (15)
| Oracle Arena18,002
| 24–25
|- bgcolor="#ccffcc"
| 50
| February 10
| Golden State
| 
| Steve Nash (18)
| Channing Frye,Marcin Gortat (9)
| Steve Nash (11)
| US Airways Center16,731
| 25–25
|- bgcolor="#ccffcc"
| 51
| February 11
| @ Utah
| 
| Steve Nash (18)
| Marcin Gortat (10)
| Steve Nash (10)
| EnergySolutions Arena19,911
| 26–25
|- bgcolor="#ffcccc"
| 52
| February 13
| Sacramento
| 
| Steve Nash (22)
| Marcin Gortat (12)
| Steve Nash (18)
| US Airways Center17,798
| 26–26
|- bgcolor="#ccffcc"
| 53
| February 15
| Utah
| 
| Channing Frye (31)
| Channing Frye (11)
| Steve Nash (14)
| US Airways Center16,874
| 27–26
|- bgcolor="#ffcccc"
| 54
| February 17
| Dallas
| 
| Channing Frye (24)
| Robin Lopez (13)
| Steve Nash (14)
| US Airways Center17,903
| 27–27
|- align="center"
|colspan="9" bgcolor="#bbcaff"|All-Star Break
|- bgcolor="#ccffcc"
| 55
| February 23
| Atlanta
| 
| Channing Frye (20)
| Marcin Gortat (12)
| Steve Nash (10)
| US Airways Center18,254
| 28–27
|- bgcolor="#ccffcc"
| 56
| February 25
| @ Toronto
| 
| Vince Carter,Marcin Gortat (17)
| Marcin Gortat (11)
| Steve Nash (11)
| Air Canada Centre19,004
| 29–27
|- bgcolor="#ccffcc"
| 57
| February 27
| @ Indiana
| 
| Grant Hill (34)
| Marcin Gortat (11)
| Steve Nash (13)
| Conseco Fieldhouse14,168
| 30–27
|- bgcolor="#ccffcc"
| 58
| February 28
| @ New Jersey
| 
| Marcin Gortat (17)
| Channing Frye (8)
| Steve Nash (15)
| Prudential Center15,836
| 31–27

|- bgcolor="#ffcccc"
| 59
| March 2
| @ Boston
| 
| Aaron Brooks (17)
| Marcin Gortat (13)
| Aaron Brooks,Steve Nash (7)
| TD Garden18,624
| 31–28
|- bgcolor="#ccffcc"
| 60
| March 4
| @ Milwaukee
| 
| Channing Frye,Mickaël Piétrus (20)
| Channing Frye (9)
| Steve Nash (13)
| Bradley Center15,011
| 32–28
|- bgcolor="#ffcccc"
| 61
| March 6
| @ Oklahoma City
| 
| Vince Carter (29)
| Channing Frye (15)
| Steve Nash (14)
| Oklahoma City Arena18,203
| 32–29
|- bgcolor="#ccffcc"
| 62
| March 8
| Houston
| 
| Vince Carter,Hakim Warrick (32)
| Marcin Gortat (16)
| Steve Nash (14)
| US Airways Center17,363
| 33–29
|- bgcolor="#ffcccc"
| 63
| March 10
| Denver
| 
| Marcin Gortat (14)
| Marcin Gortat (18)
| Aaron Brooks,Steve Nash (7)
| US Airways Center17,465
| 33–30
|- bgcolor="#ffcccc"
| 64
| March 13
| Orlando
| 
| Aaron Brooks (19)
| Hakim Warrick (8)
| Aaron Brooks (10)
| US Airways Center18,091
| 33–31
|- bgcolor="#ffcccc"
| 65
| March 14
| @ Houston
| 
| Vince Carter (21)
| Marcin Gortat,Hakim Warrick (8)
| Zabian Dowdell (5)
| Toyota Center16,262
| 33–32
|- bgcolor="#ffcccc"
| 66
| March 16
| @ New Orleans
| 
| Jared Dudley (25)
| Jared Dudley,Marcin Gortat (8)
| Steve Nash (10)
| New Orleans Arena13,758
| 33–33
|- bgcolor="#ccffcc"
| 67
| March 18
| Golden State
| 
| Marcin Gortat (18)
| Channing Frye,Marcin Gortat (9)
| Steve Nash (10)
| US Airways Center18,422
| 34–33
|- bgcolor="#ccffcc"
| 68
| March 20
| @ L.A. Clippers
| 
| Steve Nash (23)
| Marcin Gortat (13)
| Steve Nash (13)
| Staples Center19,060
| 35–33
|- bgcolor="#ffcccc"
| 69
| March 22
| @ L.A. Lakers
| 
| Channing Frye (32)
| Marcin Gortat (16)
| Steve Nash (20)
| Staples Center18,997
| 35–34
|- bgcolor="#ccffcc"
| 70
| March 23
| Toronto
| 
| Aaron Brooks (25)
| Marcin Gortat (8)
| Aaron Brooks,Steve Nash (8)
| US Airways Center17,865
| 36–34
|- bgcolor="#ffcccc"
| 71
| March 25
| New Orleans
| 
| Marcin Gortat,Grant Hill (18)
| Marcin Gortat (10)
| Steve Nash (8)
| US Airways Center18,422
| 36–35
|- bgcolor="#ffcccc"
| 72
| March 27
| Dallas
| 
| Jared Dudley,Marcin Gortat (20)
| Marcin Gortat (15)
| Steve Nash (10)
| US Airways Center17,314
| 36–36
|- bgcolor="#ffcccc"
| 73
| March 29
| @ Sacramento
| 
| Jared Dudley,Channing Frye (21)
| Marcin Gortat (11)
| Steve Nash (14)
| Power Balance Pavilion13,774
| 36–37
|- bgcolor="#ffcccc"
| 74
| March 30
| Oklahoma City
| 
| Vince Carter (28)
| Marcin Gortat (10)
| Steve Nash (9)
| US Airways Center18,033
| 36–38

|- bgcolor="#ccffcc"
| 75
| April 1
| L.A. Clippers
| 
| Grant Hill (19)
| Marcin Gortat (11)
| Aaron Brooks (6)
| US Airways Center18,422
| 37–38
|- bgcolor="#ffcccc"
| 76
| April 3
| @ San Antonio
| 
| Aaron Brooks,Channing Frye (14)
| Jared Dudley (10)
| Aaron Brooks (6)
| AT&T Center18,581
| 37–39
|- bgcolor="#ffcccc"
| 77
| April 5
| @ Chicago
| 
| Vince Carter (23)
| Marcin Gortat (13)
| Steve Nash (16)
| United Center21,873
| 37–40
|- bgcolor="#ccffcc"
| 78
| April 6
| @ Minnesota
| 
| Marcin Gortat (20)
| Marcin Gortat (16)
| Steve Nash (9)
| Target Center16,113
| 38–40
|- bgcolor="#ffcccc"
| 79
| April 8
| @ New Orleans
| 
| Jared Dudley (18)
| Jared Dudley,Channing Frye (7)
| Aaron Brooks (9)
| New Orleans Arena14,950
| 38–41
|- bgcolor="#ffcccc"
| 80
| April 10
| @ Dallas
| 
| Marcin Gortat (15)
| Marcin Gortat (9)
| Steve Nash (9)
| American Airlines Center20,355
| 38–42
|- bgcolor="#ccffcc"
| 81
| April 11
| Minnesota
| 
| Channing Frye (33)
| Jared Dudley,Marcin Gortat (8)
| Steve Nash (16)
| US Airways Center17,485
| 39–42
|- bgcolor="#ccffcc"
| 82
| April 13
| San Antonio
| 
| Marcin Gortat (21)
| Marcin Gortat (13)
| Steve Nash (10)
| US Airways Center18,195
| 40–42

Player statistics

Season

|- align="center" bgcolor=""
| * || 12 || 6 || 15.3 || .235 || .000 || .600 || 3.3 || 0.3 || .5 || .3 || 3.0
|- align="center" bgcolor="#f0f0f0"
| * || 25 || 5 || 18.9 || .430 || .328 || .807 || 1.1 || 4.2 || .5 || .0 || 9.6
|- align="center" bgcolor=""
| * || 51 || 41 || 27.2 || .422 || .366 || .735 || 3.6 || 1.6 || .9 || .3 || 13.5
|- align="center" bgcolor="#f0f0f0"
|  || 54 || 3 || 16.6 || .565† || .063 || .492 || 2.9 || 0.8 || .6 || .4 || 5.0
|- align="center" bgcolor=""
| * || 9 || 0 || 8.0 || .387 || .000 || .500 || 1.9 || 0.4 || .1 || .3 || 3.2
|- align="center" bgcolor="#f0f0f0"
|  || 24 || 0 || 12.2 || .408 || .300 || .941# || 0.8 || 2.1 || .8 || .1 || 5.0
|- align="center" bgcolor=""
| * || 48 || 2 || 17.8 || .421 || .277 || .608 || 1.8 || 3.1 || .8 || .1 || 7.4
|- align="center" bgcolor="#f0f0f0"
|  || style="background:#FF8800;color:#423189;" | 82 || 15 || 26.1 || .477 || .415 || .743 || 3.9 || 1.3 || style="background:#FF8800;color:#423189;" | 1.1+ || .2 || 10.6
|- align="center" bgcolor=""
|  || 77 || 64 || 33.0 || .432 || .390 || .832 || style="background:#FF8800;color:#423189;" | 6.7+ || 1.2 || .6 || style="background:#FF8800;color:#423189;" | 1.0+ || 12.7
|- align="center" bgcolor="#f0f0f0"
| * || 55 || 12 || 29.7 || .563† || .250 || .731 || 9.3+ || 1.0 || .5 || 1.3+ || 13.0
|- align="center" bgcolor=""
|  || 80 || style="background:#FF8800;color:#423189;" | 80 || 30.1 || .484 || .395 || .829 || 4.2 || 2.5 || .8 || .4 || 13.2
|- align="center" bgcolor="#f0f0f0"
|  || 1 || 0 || 2.0 || .000 || .000 || .000 || 0.0 || 0.0 || .0 || .0 || 0.0
|- align="center" bgcolor=""
|  || 67 || 56 || 14.8 || .501† || .000 || .740 || 3.2 || 0.1 || .3 || .7 || 6.4
|- align="center" bgcolor="#f0f0f0"
|  || 75 || 75 || style="background:#FF8800;color:#423189;" | 33.3 || style="background:#FF8800;color:#423189;" | .492† || .395 || style="background:#FF8800;color:#423189;" | .912# || 3.5 || style="background:#FF8800;color:#423189;" | 11.4 || .6 || .1 || style="background:#FF8800;color:#423189;" | 14.7+
|- align="center" bgcolor=""
| * || 38 || 4 || 18.1 || .392 || .342 || .706 || 2.0 || 0.6 || .5 || .5 || 7.4
|- align="center" bgcolor="#f0f0f0"
| * || 25 || 25 || 31.8 || .470 || style="background:#FF8800;color:#423189;" | .419^ || .764 || 4.4 || 1.4 || 1.1+ || .1 || 19.3+
|- align="center" bgcolor=""
|  || 21 || 0 || 4.8 || .548† || .000 || .500 || 1.3 || 0.1 || .1 || .2 || 2.1
|- align="center" bgcolor="#f0f0f0"
| * || 25 || 16 || 25.2 || .440 || .423^ || .722 || 4.0 || 2.3 || .7 || .6 || 9.5
|- align="center" bgcolor=""
|  || 80 || 6 || 17.7 || .511† || .091 || .721 || 3.7 || 0.9 || .4 || .1 || 8.4
|}
* – Stats with the Suns.
† – Minimum 300 field goals made.
^ – Minimum 55 three-pointers made.
# – Minimum 125 free throws made.
+ – Minimum 70 games played or 800 rebounds, 125 steals, 100 blocks, 1400 points.

Awards, records and milestones

Awards

Week/Month

All-Star

Season
Steve Nash led the league in assists with 11.4 assists per game.

Records
On November 14, 2010, the Suns scored a franchise record 22 three-pointers in a victory over the Los Angeles Lakers.

Milestones
On January 16, 2011, Vince Carter scored his 20,000th point in a victory over the New York Knicks.

Team Milestones

Injuries and surgeries
During the Los Angeles Lakers game on November 14, Jared Dudley accidentally landed on Robin Lopez's right leg. Robin was slated to be out for 1–2 weeks. This caused the Suns to replace Matt Janning with Earl Barron.

Transactions

Trades

Free agents

Additions

Subtractions

References

Phoenix Suns seasons
Phoenix